Huili Temple is a Buddhist temple located in Xishan Park, Jiashi Subdistrict, Haining, Zhejiang, China.

History
The temple traces its origins to the former Zhiyuan Temple, founded by an official Zhang Yanguang between 373 and 375, during the Eastern Jin dynasty (317–420), and would later become Huili Temple in 1009, in the Song dynasty (960–1279).

Architecture
The Mahavira Hall was rebuilt in 1922. It is five rooms wide with double-eave gable and hip roofs.

The temple has two Buddhist stone pillars, which were built in 874, in the Tang dynasty (618–907). In May 2013, they were added to the seventh batch of "List of Major National Historical and Cultural Sites in Zhejiang" by the State Council of China. The base are shaped as sumeru pedestals and are decorated with relief carvings of the Buddha, lotus petals, and other designs. The bodies are carved with Buddhist sutra Uṣṇīṣa Vijaya Dhāraṇī Sūtra.

Neighbouring area
Ziwei Bridge

References

Buddhist temples in Zhejiang
Tourist attractions in Jiaxing
20th-century establishments in China
20th-century Buddhist temples